Altukhovo is the name of several inhabited localities in Russia.

Urban localities
Altukhovo, Bryansk Oblast, a work settlement in Navlinsky District of Bryansk Oblast

Rural localities
Altukhovo, Kaluga Oblast, a village in Zhukovsky District of Kaluga Oblast
Altukhovo, Podolsky District, Moscow Oblast, a village in Lagovskoye Rural Settlement of Podolsky District of Moscow Oblast
Altukhovo, Gololobovskoye Rural Settlement, Zaraysky District, Moscow Oblast, a village in Gololobovskoye Rural Settlement of Zaraysky District of Moscow Oblast
Altukhovo, Karinskoye Rural Settlement, Zaraysky District, Moscow Oblast, a village in Karinskoye Rural Settlement of Zaraysky District of Moscow Oblast
Altukhovo, Nizhny Novgorod Oblast, a village in Kazakovsky Selsoviet of Vachsky District of Nizhny Novgorod Oblast
Altukhovo, Klepikovsky District, Ryazan Oblast, a village in Tyukovsky Rural Okrug of Klepikovsky District of Ryazan Oblast
Altukhovo, Ryazansky District, Ryazan Oblast, a village in Semenovsky Rural Okrug of Ryazansky District of Ryazan Oblast
Altukhovo, Samara Oblast, a selo in Kinel-Cherkassky District of Samara Oblast